Musculus niger, or the black mussel, is a species of bivalve mollusc in the family Mytilidae. It can be found in the Atlantic Ocean, eastern Pacific Ocean, and the Arctic Ocean. Along the Atlantic coast of North America, it ranges from the Arctic Ocean to North Carolina.

References

niger
Fauna of the Arctic Ocean
Molluscs of the Atlantic Ocean
Molluscs of the Pacific Ocean
Taxa named by John Edward Gray
Bivalves described in 1824